Leucosolenia is a genus of calcareous sponges belonging to the family Leucosoleniidae. Species of this genus usually appear as groups of curved vases, up to 2 cm long, each ending in an osculum. The overall shape is sometimes likened to a tiny bunch of bananas. They are most often observed in tide pools, clustered around the base of seaweeds or on rocks, and occur in a variety of colours, usually rather pale. Its canal system is of asconoid type. The colony consists of few simple vase-like, cylindrical individuals each terminating in an osculum and united at their bases by irregular horizontal tubes. Leucosolenia reproduces both asexually and sexually. asexual reproduction by budding and sexual reproduction takes place by formation of gametes, i.e., ova and sperms. Lecosolenia is hermaphrodite, because both the gametes are formed in the body of same individual. Sponges are mostly asymmetrical, but Leucosolenia is symmetrical.

Species
The following species are recognised in the genus Leucosolenia:
 Leucosolenia aboralis Brøndsted, 1931
 Leucosolenia albatrossi Hôzawa, 1918
 Leucosolenia arachnoides (Haeckel, 1872)
 Leucosolenia australis Brøndsted, 1931
 Leucosolenia botryoides (Ellis & Solander, 1786)
 Leucosolenia brondstedi Van Soest & Hooper, 2020
 Leucosolenia cervicornis (Haeckel, 1872)
 Leucosolenia clarkii (Verrill, 1873)
 Leucosolenia complicata (Montagu, 1814)
 Leucosolenia corallorrhiza (Haeckel, 1872)
 Leucosolenia cyathus (Haeckel, 1870)
 Leucosolenia discoveryi Jenkin, 1908
 Leucosolenia echinata Kirk, 1893
 Leucosolenia eleanor Urban, 1906
 Leucosolenia eustephana Haeckel, 1872
 Leucosolenia falklandica Breitfuss, 1898
 Leucosolenia feuerlandica Tanita, 1942
 Leucosolenia fragilis (Haeckel, 1870)
 Leucosolenia gegenbauri (Haeckel, 1870)
 Leucosolenia goethei (Haeckel, 1870)
 Leucosolenia hispidissima (Haeckel, 1872)
 Leucosolenia horrida (Schmidt in Haeckel, 1872)
 Leucosolenia incerta Urban, 1908
 Leucosolenia kagoshimensis (Hozawa, 1929)
 Leucosolenia lucasi Dendy, 1891
 Leucosolenia macquariensis Dendy, 1918
 Leucosolenia microspinata Longo, 2009
 Leucosolenia minchini Jenkin, 1908
 Leucosolenia minuta Tanita, 1943
 Leucosolenia mollis Tanita, 1941
 Leucosolenia nautilia de Laubenfels, 1930
 Leucosolenia parthenopea Sarà, 1953
 Leucosolenia pilosella Brøndsted, 1931
 Leucosolenia pyriformis Tanita, 1943
 Leucosolenia rosea Kirk, 1896
 Leucosolenia salpinx Van Soest, 2017
 Leucosolenia serica Tanita, 1942
 Leucosolenia somesii (Bowerbank, 1874)
 Leucosolenia tenera Tanita, 1940
 Leucosolenia variabilis Haeckel, 1870
 Leucosolenia ventosa Hôzawa, 1940
 Leucosolenia vesicula (Haeckel, 1870)

References

Taxonomicon
North East Atlantic Taxa

Leucosolenida
Taxa named by James Scott Bowerbank